Phyllograptus is a graptolite genus of the order Graptoloidea, in the family Phyllograptidae.

Fossils of this genus have been found in the Early Ordovician (475-473 million years ago), in the sediments of Australia, Bolivia, Canada, Chile, China, New Zealand, Norway, Spain, Sweden, the United Kingdom and United States.

They were passively mobile planktonic suspension feeders.

Phyllograptus species are excellent index fossils or guide fossils for identifying Ordovician rocks.

Species
 Phyllograptus angustifolius
 Phyllograptus anna
 Phyllograptus densus
 Phyllograptus glossograptoides
 Phyllograptus rotundatus

References

 Cyril Walker & David Ward (1993) - Fossielen: Sesam Natuur Handboeken, Bosch & Keuning, Baarn. 

Graptolite genera
Graptoloidea
Index fossils
Early Ordovician animals
Paleozoic life of the Northwest Territories